Arcadia is a coastal suburb on Magnetic Island in the City of Townsville, Queensland, Australia.

The town of Alma Bay is within the suburb.

Geography 
Arcadia is predominantly residential with around 97% of the dwellings being housing or unit type dwellings.

History 
Arcadia Valley State School opened on 30 March 1975.

Education 
There are no schools in Arcadia. The nearest primary school is in Nelly Bay on the island. The nearest secondary school is Townsville State High School in Railway Estate in the Townsville mainland.

Attractions 
Arcadia is also home to Alma Bay and Geoffrey Bay, which are the Island's best known beaches. It is also home to Centaur Guest House, a World War 2 house built in memory of the hospital ship Centaur.

Arcadia is home to the famous toad racing and a small population of rock wallabies.

References

External links 
 

Suburbs of Townsville
Magnetic Island